Hassie Harrison (born March 20, 1990) is an American actress. She was born in Dallas, Texas. She is known for Yellowstone, Tacoma FD and The Iron Orchard.

Early life
Harrison was born in Dallas, Texas. Her mother was heavily involved with the children’s theater in Dallas, where Harrison found her love in acting.  She started college at age 15, studying European Cinema in Copenhagen, Denmark. She later attended a drama school headed by acting coach Ivana Chubbuck, where she learned modern methods of film performance and creativity. She also joined the Upright Citizens Brigade, an American improvisational theatre which teaches comedy skills.

Filmography

References

External links
 

1990 births
Living people
American film actresses
American television actresses
21st-century American actresses